Norman George Mollett Prichard (14 April 1895 – 10 April 1972) was a British politician, who chaired London County Council.

Born in Denton, Norfolk, Prichard was the son of A. G. Prichard, a minister and politician.  Norman grew up in London, and was educated at the Henry Thornton School in Clapham, then at King's College, London.  He found work with the Inland Revenue, and became a supporter of the Labour Party.  He also qualified as a barrister, and was accepted at Lincoln's Inn in 1924.

In 1927, Prichard wished to stand for the London County Council, but he was refused permission by his employer.  Instead, he focused on more local government, winning election to Battersea Metropolitan Borough Council, and serving as Mayor of Battersea in 1935/36.  From 1949, he led the joint standing committee of the London boroughs.  In 1950, the government decided to permit its employees to sit on London County Council, and Prichard was elected as an alderman, and by 1955/56 was the council's chair.

In 1965, London's local government was restructured.  Prichard won a seat on the new Greater London Council, and he also became the first chair of the London Boroughs Association.  He left the council in 1967, but was re-elected to it in 1970, representing Wandsworth.  In his last years, he advocated for free public transport.

References

1895 births
1972 deaths
Alumni of King's College London
English barristers
Labour Party (UK) councillors
Mayors of places in Greater London
Members of London County Council
Members of the Greater London Council
People from Denton, Norfolk
20th-century English lawyers